The 1953 Pittsburgh Panthers football team represented the University of Pittsburgh in the 1953 college football season.  The team compiled a 3–5–1 record under head coach Red Dawson.

Schedule

References

Pittsburgh Panthers
Pittsburgh Panthers football seasons
Pittsburgh Panthers football